ZTV may refer to:

ZTV (Sweden), former Swedish television station (1991–2010)
ZTV (Japan), Japanese cable television operator headquartered in Tsu, Mie Prefecture, Japan
ZTV Norway, former Norwegian television channel (1995–1996, 2002–2007)
Zee TV, Indian cable and satellite television channel
Z Channel, United States pay cable service headquartered in Santa Monica, California